Françoise Branget (born 8 August 1953 in Chalon-sur-Saône, Saône-et-Loire) was the deputy representing Doubs's 1st constituency of the National Assembly of France. She was a member of the Union for a Popular Movement.

References

1953 births
Living people
People from Chalon-sur-Saône
Union for a Popular Movement politicians
Women members of the National Assembly (France)
Deputies of the 13th National Assembly of the French Fifth Republic
21st-century French women politicians